Yves de Bayser (1920–1999) was a French poet, essayist, and translator.

Life
He was discovered by René Char and contributed to 1946 journals: Fontaine, L’Arche, Botteghe oscure, and Mercure de France. 
In 1954, Albert Camus published his essays, Églogues du tyran, in his Gallimard collection.

Awards
 1975 Société des gens de lettres Grand Prix de la poésie
 1980 Mallarmé prize

Works
 Douze poèmes pour un secret,  Guy Lévis-Mano 1948.
 Également auteur du Jardin (Tchou, 1970), préfacé par André Pieyre de Mandiargues
 Inscrire (Granit, 1979) 
 Le jardin, Granit, 1993 LCCN 71574986
 Apercevoir,  Fata Morgana, 1999.

Translations
 Le cycle de Cuchulain William Butler Yeats, Translated by	Yves de Bayser, Obliques, 1974
 "Le Seuile du Palais du Roi", Cahiers de l'Herne, Yeats,

English translations
 Adam international review, Volumes 42-43, 1980

References

1920 births
1999 deaths
20th-century French poets
20th-century French translators
French male essayists
French male poets
20th-century French essayists
20th-century French male writers